The Biggest Heroes is a 1996 Danish comedy road film directed by Thomas Vinterberg.

Synopsis
Karsten, a bank robber on probation, gets the surprise of his life when one of his exes, Lisbeth, shows up out of the blue and announces that he has a twelve-year-old daughter, Louise, and that he must take care of her. Her stepfather, Allan, is abusive and she can no longer stay with him. Karsten, his partner-in-crime Peter, and Louise flee to Sweden as Karsten's probation has expired. Allan goes in pursuit of the girl. In Sweden, Karsten's plan is to hole up with another old flame, Pernille, who lives in the north with her friend Eve. As Allan catches up with the trio, he engages in an altercation with Karsten and ends up dead. All the while, Karsten is chased by the police, who uncover one crime after another, including Allan's death. In a final confrontation with officers of the law at an airport, both Karsten and Peter are gunned down, while Louise returns to Helsinki.

Cast and characters
 Thomas Bo Larsen as Karsten
 Ulrich Thomsen as Peter
  as Louise
 Bjarne Henriksen as Allan
 Paprika Steen as Lisbeth
 Trine Dyrholm as Pernille
 Hella Joof as Eva

External links
 
 

1996 drama films
1996 films
Danish comedy films
Films directed by Thomas Vinterberg
Scanbox Entertainment films